Glyn Geoffrey Ellis (28 October 19456 August 2020), known professionally as Wayne Fontana, was an English rock and pop singer best known for fronting the beat group the Mindbenders, with whom he recorded the hit singles "Um, Um, Um, Um, Um, Um" (1964) and "The Game of Love" (1965). After leaving the Mindbenders to pursue a solo career, Fontana had further UK successes including "Pamela Pamela" (1966). Despite legal issues in the 2000s, he continued to perform on the 60s nostalgia circuit until his death.

Biography

Music career 

Fontana was born in Levenshulme, Manchester, Lancashire, and took his stage name from Elvis Presley's drummer, D. J. Fontana. In June 1963 he formed his backing group, the Mindbenders, and secured a recording contract with, coincidentally, Fontana Records. With the band, Fontana released his biggest single "The Game of Love" and after several less successful singles, including "It's Just a Little Bit Too Late" and "She Needs Love" he left the band in October 1965. He reportedly quit during a concert performance.

Fontana remained under contract to the label after parting with the Mindbenders and continued alone, using musicians working under the name of the Opposition, notably Frank Renshaw (lead guitar) (born 22 June 1943, Wythenshawe, Manchester), Bernie Burns (drums), Stuart Sirret (bass), and Phil Keen (drums), among others. Sometimes the band was billed as the Mindbenders, sometimes just as the Wayne Fontana Band. Struggling to achieve chart success, Fontana recorded a number of songs by outside writers with B-sides being mostly his own compositions. Fontana's biggest solo single, "Pamela, Pamela", written by Graham Gouldman, reached No. 5 in Australia's Kent Music Report and No. 11 on the UK Singles Chart in early 1967. It was his last single to chart in the UK. The later singles included another Gouldman composition, "The Impossible Years". In 1970 he was one of the first performers at the Glastonbury Festival. After a streak of flopped releases, Fontana took a break in 1970.

In 1973, trying to re-launch his career, Fontana recorded yet another Gouldman song, "Together". It was backed with an original song, "One-Man Woman", that was co-produced with Eric Stewart, an ex-bandmate from the Mindbenders. The single failed to chart. After his last single, "The Last Bus Home", released by Polydor in 1976, he largely left the music business. For a short period around the early 1980s The Salford Jets backed him, billed as Wayne Fontana and The Mindbenders. He told the Daily Express in 2017, "I went into self-retirement, drank too much and didn't know where I was half the time." After giving up drinking he joined the 60s revival circuit.

Later years
In 2005, he fought off bankruptcy but was arrested after police were called by bailiffs who went to his home in Glossop, Derbyshire. He poured petrol onto the bonnet of a bailiff's car and set it alight with the bailiff still inside. Fontana was remanded in custody on 25 May 2007. He later appeared at Derby Crown Court dressed as Lady Justice, complete with a sword, scales, crown, cape and dark glasses, and claiming "justice is blind". He dismissed his lawyers. On 10 November 2007 he was sentenced to 11 months for setting fire to the car but was released because he had already served the equivalent of the term, having been held under the Mental Health Act 1983.

In March 2011 Fontana was arrested at the Palace Theatre, Manchester, after failing to appear in court in Wakefield, over an unpaid speeding fine.

Fontana continued to perform, notably in the Solid Silver 60s Shows.

Fontana died from cancer on 6 August 2020, at Stepping Hill Hospital, Stockport, at the age of 74. His long-term partner was by his side. He had a daughter and two sons.

Discography

Studio albums
Wayne Fontana and the Mindbenders
Wayne Fontana and the Mindbenders – December 1964 (UK Fontana TL5230) #18. UK.
The Game of Love – April 1965 (US Fontana MGF 27542 (Mono)/SRF 67542 (Stereo))
Eric, Rick, Wayne and Bob – It's Wayne Fontana and the Mindbenders – February 1965 (UK Fontana TL5257) label has: Um, Um, Um, Um, Um, Um – It's Wayne Fontana and the Mindbenders) )
Wayne Fontana
Wayne One – July 1966 (UK Fontana TL5351 (Mono)/STL5351 (Stereo))
Wayne Fontana – June 1967 (US MGM E 4459 (Mono)/SE 4459 (Stereo))

Compilation albums
Hit Single Anthology – 1991 (Europe Fontana 848 161-2)
The Best of Wayne Fontana & The Mindbenders – 1994 (US Fontana 314 522 666-2)

Singles

Wayne Fontana and the Mindbenders

Wayne Fontana (solo)

References

External links
 

 

1945 births
2020 deaths
People from Levenshulme
British Invasion artists
Musicians from Manchester
Beat musicians
English pop singers
Fontana Records artists
English criminals
Deaths from cancer in England